Diego Manuel Hernández González (born 22 June 2000) is a Uruguayan professional footballer who plays as an attacking midfielder or winger for Montevideo Wanderers.

Club career
Hernández is a former youth academy player of Peñarol. After being released by the club in December 2018, he moved to Montevideo Wanderers. He made his professional debut for Wanderers on 12 September 2020 in a 2–1 league defeat against Plaza Colonia.

International career
On 20 March 2023, Hernández received his first call-up to the Uruguay national team as a replacement for injured Giorgian de Arrascaeta.

References

External links
 

2000 births
Living people
Footballers from Montevideo
Uruguayan footballers
Association football midfielders
Montevideo Wanderers F.C. players
Uruguayan Primera División players